Elections to Newcastle-under-Lyme Borough Council were held on 3 May 2007.  One third of the council was up for election and the council stayed under no overall control.

After the election, the composition of the council was:
Labour 20
Conservative 20
Liberal Democrat 18
United Kingdom Independence Party 2

Election result

Ward results

References
2007 Newcastle-under-Lyme election result

2007
2007 English local elections
2000s in Staffordshire